Marta Bolagh (also Romanized as Marta‘ Bolāgh; also known as Marta‘ Bodāgh, Shāh Bodāgh, Shāh Bolāgh, and Shāh Bulāq) is a village in Sangestan Rural District, in the Central District of Hamadan County, Hamadan Province, Iran. At the 2006 census, its population was 75, in 17 families.

References 

Populated places in Hamadan County